Theophilus II may refer to:

 Theophilus II (Coptic patriarch of Alexandria) (ruled 952–956) 
 Theophilus II (Greek patriarch of Alexandria) (ruled 1010–1020), Greek Patriarch of Alexandria
 Theophilus II of Jerusalem (ruled 1417–1424), Greek Orthodox Patriarch of Jerusalem